The Tres Marias Championship was a women's professional golf tournament on the LPGA Tour, played from 2005 to 2010, at Tres Marias Residential Golf Club in Morelia, Michoacan, Mexico.

From 2005 through 2009 the title sponsor of the tournament was Mexican beer Corona. Lorena Ochoa of Mexico won the event three times: 2006, 2008, and 2009.

The 2011 tournament was originally scheduled for April 21–24. On February 2, the LPGA announced that the tournament had been canceled because of concerns about violence in the Mexican state of Michoacan but in reality there was a lack of sponsors to keep going the tournament as Lorena Ochoa retired that year.

The tournament was not scheduled in 2012.

Tournament names
2005-2006: Corona Morelia Championship
2007-2009: Corona Championship
2010: Tres Marias Championship

Winners

Tournament record

References

External links
LPGA official tournament microsite
Tournament results at golfobserver.com

Former LPGA Tour events
Golf tournaments in Mexico
Women's sport in Mexico
Michoacán